Mikhail Stefanovich (born 27 November 1989) is a Belarusian professional ice hockey player currently under contract with Yunost Minsk of the Belarusian Extraliga (BXL). He was drafted by the Toronto Maple Leafs in the fourth round of the 2008 NHL Entry Draft, and was the 2nd overall pick in the 2009 KHL Junior Draft.

Playing career
Stefanovich's career started out in his home country of Belarus, spending just over two seasons in Belarus' tier two hockey league – half a season with HC Dinamo-2 Minsk, and just over one and a half seasons with HC Homiel-2. After playing just three games with HC Homiel-2 in the 2006–07 tier two season, HC Homiel of the Belarusian Extraliga called him up. He finished the rest of the season with Homiel.

Following the season, Stefanovich was selected 54th overall in the 2007 CHL Import Draft by the Quebec Remparts. Upon arriving in Canada, Stefanovich made the Remparts roster. Halfway through his inaugural QMJHL season, Stefanovich was selected to play in the CHL Top Prospects Game and, following the conclusion of the season, received the Mike Bossy Trophy, which is awarded to the QMJHL player judged to be the best professional prospect.

On 1 June 2009, Stefanovich was selected second overall in the 2009 KHL Junior Draft by HC Dinamo Minsk. Two days later, on 3 June, he was signed to an entry-level contract by the Maple Leafs. On 19 September 2009, Stefanovich was assigned to the Toronto Marlies, the AHL affiliate of the Maple Leafs, and shortly after demoted back to junior.

On 15 September 2010, the Maple Leafs announced that Stefanovich would be part of the team's 63-player training camp roster, however, eight days later, the team assigned him to the Toronto Marlies. Stefanovich was named to the Marlies' opening day roster on 8 October, but was reassigned to the Reading Royals on 14 October 2010. On 18 October, Stefanovich was recalled to the Marlies.  After playing only 2 games with the Marlies, he was again reassigned to the Royals on 22 November 2010. Stefanovich was loaned out to HC Dinamo Minsk of the KHL on 27 November 2010. On 13 January 2011, Stefanovich's NHL rights were traded by the Maple Leafs to the Dallas Stars for Fabian Brunnstrom.

During his second season in the Russian second tier league, the VHL, with Dizel Penza, Stefanovich was provisionally suspended on 20 November for failing an anti-doping test. He played no further part in the season with Dizel and on 27 April 2015, was given a two-year ban backdated to 10 November, for the doping violation.

On 26 August 2015, he returned to North American and signed a one-year ECHL contract with the Rapid City Rush.

International play
Stefanovich has played in the three World Juniors. He also participated at the 2010 IIHF World Championship as a member of the Belarus men's national ice hockey team.

Career statistics

Regular season and playoffs

International

Awards
QMJHL Rookie Player of the Month (September 2007)
RDS Rookie Excellence Award (QMJHL) (Mid-season) (2007–08)
Mike Bossy Trophy – 2007–08 (Top QMJHL Professional Prospect)

References

External links

1989 births
Belarusian ice hockey right wingers
Dizel Penza players
HC Dinamo Minsk players
HK Gomel players
HK Neman Grodno players
HC Lada Togliatti players
Living people
Ice hockey people from Minsk
Quebec Remparts players
Rapid City Rush players
Reading Royals players
Toronto Maple Leafs draft picks
Toronto Marlies players
Toros Neftekamsk players
Yunost Minsk players